Rémi Pauriol (born 4 April 1982 in Aix-en-Provence) is a French former professional road bicycle racer, who competed as a professional between 2006 and 2013.

In 2007, he won his first professional contest, the French race Route Adélie. After the team folded at the end of the season, Pauriol retired in January 2014.

Major results

2006
 1st Stage 3 (TTT) Tour Méditerranéen
 2nd Overall Paris–Corrèze
2007
 1st Route Adélie
 1st Stage 4 Tour de Wallonie
2008
 3rd Overall Volta a Catalunya
 3rd Tour du Finistère
2009
 1st Grand Prix d'Ouverture
 1st GP Lugano
2010
 9th Overall Tour of Turkey
1st Mountains classification
2011
 1st  Mountains classification, Paris–Nice
 1st  Mountains classification, Tour Méditerranéen
2012
 1st Les Boucles du Sud Ardèche
2013
 2nd Classic Sud-Ardèche
 6th Boucles de l'Aulne

Grand Tour general classification results timeline

References

External links

Rémi Pauriol's profile on Cycling Base

1982 births
Living people
French male cyclists
Cyclists at the 2008 Summer Olympics
Olympic cyclists of France
Sportspeople from Aix-en-Provence
Cyclists from Provence-Alpes-Côte d'Azur